Abdul Haque Politician of Dinajpur District of Bangladesh and former member of Parliament for Dinajpur-5 constituency in 1973.

Career 
Abdul Haque is a freedom fighter. He was elected to parliament from Dinajpur-5 as a Bangladesh Awami League candidate in 1973 Bangladeshi general election.

References 

Living people
Year of birth missing (living people)
People from Dinajpur District, Bangladesh
Awami League politicians
1st Jatiya Sangsad members